|}

The Ten Up Novice Chase is a Grade 2 National Hunt steeplechase in Ireland. It is run at Navan Racecourse in February, over a distance of about 3 miles (4,828 metres). The race was first run in 2003.

Records
Leading jockey (4 wins):
 Ruby Walsh - Snowy Morning (2007), Pomme Tiepy (2008), Uimhiraceathair (2010 - Dead Heat), Terminal (2013) 

Leading trainer  (5 wins):
 Willie Mullins – Snowy Morning (2007), Pomme Tiepy (2008), Uimhiraceathair (2010 - Dead Heat), Terminal (2013), Measureofmydreams (2016)

Winners
 Amateur jockeys indicated by "Mr".

See also
 Horseracing in Ireland
 List of Irish National Hunt races

References

Racing Post:

National Hunt races in Ireland
National Hunt chases
Navan Racecourse
Recurring sporting events established in 2003